Josiah Gray (born December 21, 1997) is an American professional baseball pitcher for the Washington Nationals of Major League Baseball (MLB). He has played in MLB for the Los Angeles Dodgers. He was drafted by the Cincinnati Reds in the second round of the 2018 Major League Baseball draft.

Amateur career
After not being heavily recruited out of New Rochelle High School, Gray accepted his only scholarship offer to play college baseball at Le Moyne College in Syracuse, New York. He spent his first two seasons at Le Moyne splitting time as a shortstop and a pitcher before transitioning to the mound full-time. As a freshman he had a batting average of just .265 and an earned run average (ERA) of 8.31. After becoming the full-time closer as a sophomore, he posted an ERA of 0.63. In 2017, he played collegiate summer baseball with the Chatham Anglers of the Cape Cod Baseball League. As a junior in 2018, he went 11–0 with a 1.25 ERA in 13 starts.

Professional career

Cincinnati Reds
Gray was drafted by the Cincinnati Reds in the second round, 72nd overall, of the 2018 MLB draft. He signed and made his professional debut with the Greeneville Reds, going 2–2 with a 2.58 ERA in 12 starts.

Los Angeles Dodgers
On December 21, 2018, the Reds traded Gray, along with Jeter Downs and Homer Bailey, to the Los Angeles Dodgers in exchange for Matt Kemp, Yasiel Puig, Alex Wood, Kyle Farmer and cash considerations. He began 2019 with the Single-A Great Lakes Loons, and was promoted to the High-A Rancho Cucamonga Quakes in May. In July, he was promoted to the Double-A Tulsa Drillers. Between the three levels in 2019, he made 25 starts (and one relief appearance) with an 11–2 record and 2.70 ERA with 147 strikeouts in 130 innings. He was named as the Dodgers Minor League pitcher of the year.

Gray did not play in a game in 2020 due to the cancellation of the minor league season because of the COVID-19 pandemic.  In 2021, Gray was assigned to the Triple-A Oklahoma City Dodgers, where he was the opening day starter. However, he was shut down after the start and missed the next two months due to a shoulder strain. He rejoined Oklahoma City and pitched in three more games. He had 22 strikeouts against only two walks in 15⅔ innings. On July 20, 2021, Gray was added to the 40-man roster promoted to the major leagues for the first time. He made his MLB debut the same day, pitching four innings and allowing four earned runs (on three home runs) with seven strikeouts versus the San Francisco Giants. His first MLB strikeout was against Wilmer Flores. He appeared in one other game for the Dodgers, making his first MLB start on July 25 against the Colorado Rockies, striking out six in four innings while allowing two runs on three hits and four walks.

Washington Nationals
On July 30, 2021, Gray was traded to the Washington Nationals along with Keibert Ruiz, Donovan Casey, and Gerardo Carrillo in exchange for Max Scherzer and Trea Turner. Gray debuted for Washington on August 2, 2021 vs the Philadelphia Phillies. He allowed four hits and one run over five innings for no decision. On September 22, 2021 Gray recorded his first Major League win in a 6 inning outing against the Miami Marlins, in which he allowed 6 hits and 2 earned runs while recording 8 strikeouts.

In 2022 he was 7-10 with a 5.02 ERA in 148.2 innings, and led the majors in home runs allowed, with 38, and the highest rate of home runs per 9 innings, at 2.3.

Personal life
Gray's father died of cancer a month after he was a second-round draft pick of the Cincinnati Reds. His father suffered a long illness and wasn’t able to see Gray pitch often during his last season at Le Moyne. Gray has a girlfriend, Riley Wilde, whom he has been in a relationship with since 2016.

References

External links

1997 births
Living people
Sportspeople from New Rochelle, New York
Baseball players from New York (state)
African-American baseball players
Major League Baseball pitchers
Los Angeles Dodgers players
Washington Nationals players
Le Moyne Dolphins baseball players
Chatham Anglers players
Danbury Westerners players
Greeneville Reds players
Great Lakes Loons players
Rancho Cucamonga Quakes players
Tulsa Drillers players
Oklahoma City Dodgers players
21st-century African-American sportspeople
New Rochelle High School alumni